The Center for Progressive Christianity (TCPC) was founded in 1996 by, retired Episcopal priest, James Rowe Adams in Cambridge, Massachusetts. It is established in line with the larger progressive movement within American Christianity taking place in mainline Protestant churches. The Center is a nondenominational network of affiliated congregations, informal groups, and individuals.

Mission
The stated mission of The Center for Progressive Christianity is:
"To reach out to those for whom organized religion has proved ineffectual, irrelevant, or repressive, as well as to those who have given up on or are unacquainted with it."
"To uphold evangelism as an agent of justice and peace."
"To give a strong voice both in the churches and the public arena to the advocates of progressive Christianity."
"To support those who embrace the search, not certainty."

Members
One of the Center for Progressive Christianity's goals involves creating a very broad tent. Their fourth point invites: "...all people to participate in our community and worship life without insisting that they become like us in order to be acceptable (including but not limited to): believers and agnostics, conventional Christians and questioning skeptics, women and men, those of all sexual orientations and gender identities, those of all races and cultures, those of all classes and abilities, those who hope for a better world and those who have lost hope." Most affiliates generally view religious belief as a process or journey—a searching for truth rather than establishing truth. Liberal Christians or post-Christians who stress justice and tolerance above creeds may also be attracted to the movement. The Center for Progressive Christianity has also during its growth with the progressive Christian movement in the United States inspired an offshoot in the British Progressive Christianity Network.

People who may be considered progressive Christians include those who:

Disagree with and may even be repelled by exclusivist beliefs.
Reject the concept that only their branch of their religion has a monopoly on truth and that all other spiritual paths are in error.
Attempt to move beyond biblical inerrancy, established creeds, and church dogma. They try to recognize, as author Jack Good has written: "the fingerprints of humankind on all religious documents and symbols."
Value the search for truth, even though they believe the truth can never be fully possessed. They view it as more important and challenging than the acceptance of those fixed beliefs found in the past by others and embedded in church creeds.
Who are, as Jack Good describes, "chaos tolerant": They can handle a degree of disorder, uncertainty, and ambiguity in life and want to be "partners in the exciting search for tentative but satisfying answers to the most pressing problems of existence."
Can absorb rapid change in their beliefs, as they integrate findings from social and physical sciences.
Believe in the Ethic of Reciprocity: that how they treat other people is more important than the specifics of what they believe about God, humanity and the rest of the universe. That Collective Salvation is required for the salvation of the earth and society.

The TCPC website gives an analogy that symbolizes the methodology of the Progressive Christianity movement. It involves a Sunday school teacher and a class of 9 or 10-year-olds. Even at that age, some were skeptical of the inerrancy of the Bible. The teacher suggested that they read Charlotte's Web instead. The class enjoyed the book. The teacher interjected the thought that pigs and spiders cannot talk. The kids protested: "Well, it's a story." The teacher asked whether the story was true. They decided that it was sort of true. "In a way, it was true." So the teacher suggested: "let's look at the Bible in the same way."

For the movement's founder, James Rowe Adams, "such open-ended and searching conversations are at the heart of what it means to be religious. They are the very thing he hopes to foster through the work of his small, but visionary organization. Education is at the core of the Center’s work, but it is a vision of education that calls for open-ended conversation, the use of scholarship and intellectual gifts, as well as personal experience and emotion."

Eight Points
The Eight Points are a series of ideas that describe the TCPC's approach to Christianity. The points are a description of how progressive Christians approach life, and other organizations have adopted the points as a place to begin dialog with others about progressive Christianity. The points are summarized below:

Focus: The teachings and life of Jesus provide them with a path to God.
Pluralism: They recognize that others follow their own paths to God which are equally true for them.
Communion: They view the sharing of bread and wine in Jesus' name to represent "an ancient vision of God's feast for all peoples."
Inclusivity: All are welcome to become involved; persons of all genders, sexual orientations, traditions, races, etc.
Reciprocity: How people treat one another is the "fullest expression" of their beliefs.
Search: They find more grace in searching for truth than in accepting certainty.
Community: They form communities to support each other in their quest for peace, justice, a restored environment, and to provide hope.
Cost: Following Jesus involves a personal investment in "selfless love, conscientious resistance to evil, and renunciation of privilege."

The Center for Progressive Christianity symbol is an eight-pointed star, representing the eight ideas that they hold in common.

Criticism
More conservative Christian organizations and movements have singled out the Center for Progressive Christianity for criticism on theological grounds. Other criticism is politically focused coming from members of the Christian right who disagree with socially liberal aspects of Center for Progressive Christianity's political stances. Albert Mohler president of the Southern Baptist Theological Seminary has said of the Center for Progressive Christianity, "Christians should see The Center for Progressive Christianity, not as posing a threat to Christianity itself, but as exposing the basic hatred of biblical truth that drives those on the theological left."

See also

Progressive Christianity

Footnotes

External links
 
 Progressive Christianity Website , includes links to web sites in Britain, Canada, Ireland, New Zealand, South Australia and the United States.

Christian movements
Liberalism and religion
Christian organizations established in 1996
Christian organizations based in the United States